Literary tourism is a type of cultural tourism that deals with places and events from literary texts as well as the lives of their authors. This could include visiting particular place associated with a novel or a novelist, such as a writer's home, or grave site, following routes taken by a fictional characters, visiting places mentioned in poems, as well as visiting museums dedicated to specific writers, works, regional literatures, and literary genres.

Characteristics

Some scholars regard literary tourism as a contemporary type of secular pilgrimage. There are also long-distance walking routes associated with writers, such as the Thomas Hardy Way.

Literary tourists are specifically interested in how places have influenced writing and at the same time how writing has created place. In order to become a literary tourist you need only book-love and an inquisitive mindset; however, there are literary guides, literary maps, and literary tours to help you on your way. There are also many museums associated with writers, and these are usually housed in buildings associated with a writer's birth or literary career, such as their home.

Tourism fiction
While most literary tourism is focused on famous works, more modern works that are written to specifically promote tourism are called tourism fiction. Modern tourism fiction can include travel guides within the story showing readers how to visit the real places in the fictional tales. With recent technological advances in publishing, digital tourism fiction books can even allow literary tourists to follow direct links to tourism websites related to the story. This can be done on new e-reading devices like the Kindle, iPad, iPhone, smart phones, tablets, and regular desktop and laptop computers. These links within the story allow readers to instantly learn about the real places without doing their own web searches.

The first classic novel to take advantage of tourism fiction technology was F. Scott Fitzgerald's This Side of Paradise: Interactive Tourism Edition, published by the Southeastern Literary Tourism Initiative in 2012. The tourism edition offered web links to tours of Princeton University, where Fitzgerald attended in real life and where the fictional protagonist in the novel Amory Blaine attended. The tourism edition also offered links to Montgomery, Alabama, where Fitzgerald fell in love with his future wife Zelda Sayre, much like the fictional character Amory fell in love with Rosalind.

Bookstore tourism

In addition to visiting author and book sites, literary tourists often engage in bookstore tourism, browsing local bookshops for titles specifically related to the sites as well as other regional books and authors.

Tourism sites for specific writers and works, by country

China
Du Fu Thatched Cottage, Chengdu
Lu Xun Native Place

France
Maison de Balzac
Maison de Victor Hugo
House of George Sand

Germany
Goethe House, Frankfurt
Gutenberg Museum

Japan
Endo Shusaku Literary Museum, Nagasaki
Lafcadio Hearn Memorial Museum
Osamu Dazai Memorial Museum
Picture Book Museum
Saka no Ue no Kumo Museum, Matsuyama, Ehime
Shiki Museum, Matsuyama, Ehime
Tōson Memorial Museum

Netherlands
Anne Frank House

United Kingdom
Brantwood (John Ruskin)
Brontë Parsonage
Burns Cottage
Carlyle's House
Charles Dickens Museum
Dove Cottage (William Wordsworth)
Jane Austen's House Museum, Chawton
Keats House
Sherlock Holmes Museum

United States
Edgar Allan Poe Cottage, Bronx, New York
Ernest Hemingway House
Paul Laurence Dunbar House
Walt Whitman House, Camden, New Jersey

Regional literary tourism sites

Japan
Kamakura Museum of Literature

South Africa
KZN Literary Tourism, KwaZulu-Natal

South Korea
Museum of Korean Modern Literature

See also
Film tourism
Meisho

Writer's home

References

External links 
What is Literary tourism? – WiseTour

Cultural tourism
Fiction
Types of tourism